Gustaaf Stephanus Modestus "Guus" Meeuwis (born 23 March 1972) is a Dutch singer-songwriter. As part of the band Vagant, he scored several hits in the Netherlands and Flanders during the 1990s and first decade of the 2000s. On 24 May 2015, Meeuwis became the first Dutch language performing artist ever to play a fully booked concert at London's Royal Albert Hall.

Biography

Guus Meeuwis was born at a monastery in Mariahout, a small village in the municipality of Laarbeek where his parents were living temporarily. He attended Stella Maris College, and went on to study jurisprudence in Tilburg. It quickly became apparent that Meeuwis was musically talented while at school. Following a romantic weekend in Bruges with his girlfriend Valérie he wrote the song Het is een Nacht ("It is a Night"), with which, in 1994, he won a prize at the AHC-Studentensongfestival in Leiden. He and his backing band were awarded a record contract, under the name "Guus Meeuwis & Vagant", after a café they frequented. Marc Meeuwis, Jan Willem Rozenboom, Hugo van Bilsen, Robin van Beek en Dirk Oerlemans. At the end of 2001, the group decided to split and Meeuwis continued on as a solo artist.

Honours
 Knight of the Order of Orange-Nassau (2013)

Guus Meeuwis & Vagant discography

Studio albums

Singles

Guus Meeuwis discography

Albums

Studio albums

Compilation albums

Live albums

Singles

As lead artist

As featured artist

Other appearances

Notes

External links
  Guus Meeuwis official website

References

1972 births
Living people
Dutch jurists
Dutch pop singers
Dutch male singer-songwriters
Dutch television presenters
Knights of the Order of Orange-Nassau
Musicians from North Brabant
People from Laarbeek
Singers awarded knighthoods
Tilburg University alumni
21st-century Dutch male singers
21st-century Dutch singers